This article lists notable people associated with the New York University Stern School of Business in the areas of academia, business, politics, government, and entertainment.

Academia

Business

Entertainment

Politics and government 

(*did not graduate)

References

Lists of people by university or college in New York City

Stern